Dube Jillo (born September 12, 1970) is a retired long-distance runner from Ethiopia, who won the 1996 edition of the Vienna Marathon. A year later he triumphed at the Rome City Marathon, clocking a total time of 2:13:08.

Achievements

External links

1996 Marathon Year Ranking

1970 births
Living people
Ethiopian male long-distance runners
Place of birth missing (living people)
Ethiopian male marathon runners
World Athletics Championships athletes for Ethiopia
20th-century Ethiopian people
21st-century Ethiopian people